The Stuhr Museum of the Prairie Pioneer is a museum located in Grand Island, Nebraska dedicated to preserving the legacy of the Pioneers who settled the plains of central Nebraska in the late 19th century. It features a living history village called Railroad Town, designed to evoke an 1890s-era prairie village and made up of many original period structures moved to the museum.

The museum is named after Leo Stuhr, a local farmer and politician whose family were among the area's pioneer settlers. He donated land, money, and numerous artifacts that served as the foundation of the museum. The building that houses the bulk of the museum's exhibits, the Stuhr Building, was designed by architect Edward Durell Stone and was built by Geer-Melkus Construction Co., Inc.  It was listed on the National Register of Historic Places in 2015 after undergoing a $7.4 million restoration. 

Among the structures in Railroad Town is the house where actor Henry Fonda was born in 1905. Movies filmed at the museum include Sarah, Plain and Tall (1991) and My Antonia (1995). The museum once had a working steam locomotive that traveled the  narrow gauge Nebraska Midland Railroad on the museum grounds.

References

1

External links
 Stuhr Museum Website

Grand Island, Nebraska
Living museums in Nebraska
Museums in Hall County, Nebraska
Edward Durell Stone buildings
Buildings and structures on the National Register of Historic Places in Nebraska
National Register of Historic Places in Hall County, Nebraska
Museums on the National Register of Historic Places